Osterholz-Scharmbeck is a railway station located in Osterholz-Scharmbeck, Germany. The station is located on the Bremen–Bremerhaven railway. The train services are operated by Deutsche Bahn and NordWestBahn. The station has been part of the Bremen S-Bahn since December 2010.

It is also the point where the Moorexpress heritage railway line to Stade branches off the main line.

Train services
The following services currently call at the station:

Regional services  Bremerhaven-Lehe - Bremen - Nienburg - Hanover
Regional services  Bremerhaven-Lehe - Bremen - Osnabrück
Bremen S-Bahn services  Bremerhaven-Lehe - Osterholz-Scharmbeck - Bremen - Twistringen

External links

References

Railway stations in Lower Saxony
Bremen S-Bahn